Donald Maurice Broom (born 14 July 1942) is an English biologist and emeritus professor of animal welfare at Cambridge University.

Awards 
 2000: Honorary D.Sc: De Montfort University.
 2005: Honorary Doctorate: Norwegian University of Life Sciences.

Selected works 

 Biology of Behaviour (1981)
 Farm Animal Behaviour and Welfare, with Andrew F. Fraser (1990)
 Stress and Animal Welfare with Kenneth G. Johnson (1993)
 The welfare of deer, foxes, mink and hares subjected to hunting by humans: a review (2000) Evidence to the Burns Inquiry
 The Evolution of Morality and Religion (2003)
 Sentience and Animal Welfare (2014).
 Domestic Animal Behaviour and Welfare, with Andrew F. Fraser (2015), 5th edition.

References

External links 
 CURRICULUM VITAE (SHORT FORM)– SCAHAW

Living people
1942 births
British animal welfare scholars
English biologists
Ethologists
English science writers
Alumni of St Catharine's College, Cambridge
Fellows of St Catharine's College, Cambridge
People educated at Whitgift School